The seventy-fourth Minnesota Legislature first convened on January 8, 1985. The 67 members of the Minnesota Senate were elected during the General Election of November 2, 1982, and the 134 members of the Minnesota House of Representatives were elected during the General Election of November 6, 1984.

Sessions 
The legislature met in a regular session from January 8, 1985, to May 20, 1985. A special session was convened from June 19, 1985, to June 21, 1985, to consider legislation regarding taxes, appropriations and the state budget, education, the operation of state and local governments, and major bills not passed during the regular session.

A continuation of the regular session was held between February 3, 1986, and March 21, 1986. A special session was convened on April 2, 1986, to complete action on the state budget, and bills relating to state revenue and farm loan guarantees.

Party summary 
Resignations and new members are discussed in the "Membership changes" section, below.

Senate

House of Representatives

Leadership

Senate 
President of the Senate
Jerome M. Hughes (DFL-Maplewood)

Senate Majority Leader
Roger Moe (DFL-Erskine)

Senate Minority Leader
Until January 9, 1985 James E. Ulland (IR-Duluth)
After January 9, 1985 Glen Taylor (IR-Mankato)

House of Representatives 
Speaker of the House
David M. Jennings (IR-Truman)

House Majority Leader
Connie Levi (IR-Dellwood)

House Minority Leader
Fred C. Norton (DFL-St. Paul)

Members

Senate

House of Representatives

Membership changes

Senate

House of Representatives

Notes

References 

 Minnesota Legislators Past & Present - Session Search Results (Session 74, Senate)
 Minnesota Legislators Past & Present - Session Search Results (Session 74, House)

74th
1980s in Minnesota
1985 in Minnesota
1986 in Minnesota
1985 U.S. legislative sessions
1986 U.S. legislative sessions